The 1952 Wisconsin gubernatorial election was held on November 4, 1952.

Incumbent Republican Governor Walter J. Kohler Jr. defeated Democratic nominee William Proxmire with 62.50% of the vote.

Primary elections
Primary elections were held on September 9, 1952.

Democratic primary

Candidates
William Proxmire, member of the Wisconsin State Assembly

Results

Republican primary

Candidates
Walter J. Kohler Jr., incumbent Governor

Results

General election

Candidates
William Proxmire, Democratic
Walter J. Kohler Jr., Republican
Michael Essin, Independent Progressive

Results

References

Bibliography
 
 

1952
Wisconsin
Gubernatorial
November 1952 events in the United States